The following is a list of ecoregions in Cuba as identified by the World Wide Fund for Nature (WWF).

Terrestrial ecoregions
by major habitat type

Tropical and subtropical moist broadleaf forests
 Cuban moist forests

Tropical and subtropical dry broadleaf forests
 Cuban dry forests

Tropical and subtropical coniferous forests
 Cuban pine forests

Flooded grasslands and savannas
 Cuban wetlands

Deserts and xeric shrublands
 Cuban cactus scrub

Mangroves
 Greater Antilles mangroves

Freshwater ecoregions
 Cuba - Cayman Islands

Marine ecoregions
 Greater Antilles

References
 Dinerstein, Eric; David Olson; Douglas J. Graham; et al. (1995). A Conservation Assessment of the Terrestrial Ecoregions of Latin America and the Caribbean. World Bank, Washington DC.
 Olson, D., Dinerstein, E., Canevari, P., Davidson, I., Castro, G., Morisset, V., Abell, R., and Toledo, E.; eds. (1998). Freshwater Biodiversity of Latin America and the Caribbean: A Conservation Assessment. Biodiversity Support Program, Washington DC.
 Spalding, Mark D., Helen E. Fox, Gerald R. Allen, Nick Davidson et al. "Marine Ecoregions of the World: A Bioregionalization of Coastal and Shelf Areas". Bioscience Vol. 57 No. 7, July/August 2007, pp. 573-583.

 
Ecoregions
Cuba